The cast of the television series MythBusters perform experiments to verify or debunk urban legends, old wives' tales, and the like. This is a list of the various myths tested on the show as well as the results of the experiments (the myth is Busted, Plausible, or Confirmed).

Special episodes listed here were aired separately to the normal season episodes.

Episode overview

Best of
In 2004, Discovery Channel aired three special episodes, which were a compilation of some of the best animal, electric, and explosion related myths.

Buster's Cut
During 2010, Discovery Channel aired a series of episodes that were titled "Buster's Cut". According to the episode introductions, these were edited reruns of earlier episodes featuring never before seen footage and behind the scenes information.

Episode SP11 – "Young Scientist Special"
 Original air date: April 26, 2008 (Science Channel)

A team of winners in Discovery's "Young Scientist Challenge" competitions tested environmental myths with the team.  Former MythBuster Scottie Chapman returned to assist with a myth.

The Great Ice Debate

Cattle Calamity

BBC Two re-edited shows

BBC Two's editions of MythBusters are narrated by Rufus Hound. The episodes only ran for 30 minutes.

Notes

References

External links

 MythBusters Official site
 

Special